The Myllykoski railway station is located in the town of Kouvola (formerly the municipality of Anjalankoski), Finland, in the urban area of Myllykoski. It is located along the Kouvola–Kotka railway, and its neighboring stations are Kouvola in the north and Inkeroinen in the south.

The Myllykoski station is current in the middle of a process of renovation; the work is scheduled to be finished in October 2020.

Services 
Myllykoski is served by all commuter trains on the route Kouvola–Kotka; some of these services are operated from or continue towards Lahti as well. Northbound trains towards Kouvola stop on track 1 and southbound trains towards Kotka use track 2.

External links

References 

Kouvola
Railway stations in Kymenlaakso